Ascalenia phaneracma is a moth in the family Cosmopterigidae. First described by Edward Meyrick in 1921, it is found in Zimbabwe.

References

Ascalenia
Endemic fauna of Zimbabwe
Lepidoptera of Zimbabwe
Moths of Sub-Saharan Africa
Moths described in 1921